The  and the related  are Japanese Shinkansen high-speed train types built by Hitachi Rail and Kawasaki Heavy Industries.

The E5 series is operated by East Japan Railway Company (JR East); it was introduced on Tohoku Shinkansen services on 5 March 2011 and on Hokkaido Shinkansen services on 26 March 2016. A total of 59 10-car sets are on order, with three sets in service in time for the start of new Hayabusa services to Shin-Aomori in March 2011.

The H5 series, a cold-weather derivative of the E5 series, is operated by Hokkaido Railway Company (JR Hokkaido); it has been in use on Tohoku and Hokkaido Shinkansen services since 26 March 2016. The first two sets were delivered in October 2014.

Design
Technology incorporated in these trains is derived from the experimental Fastech 360S train tested by JR East. The trains feature an electric active suspension.

H5 
The units feature a number of cold-weather improvements, including an upgraded snowplow on the lead units, durable rubber to protect the various connections between cars and a stainless-steel underframe to protect the electronics (upgraded from the usual aluminium underframe protection for added durability). They also incorporate minor interior design differences compared with the E5 series.

Operations

, E5 series and H5 trainsets work with each other, and are used on the following services on the Tohoku and Hokkaido Shinkansen lines:
 Hayabusa
 Hayate
 Yamabiko
 Nasuno

From 19 November 2011, a total of six E5 series trainsets were in operation, with sets also used on some Hayate and Yamabiko services. From the start of the revised timetable on 17 March 2012, E5 series sets were also introduced used on some Nasuno all-stations services.

The H5 series is the first JR Hokkaido train type to use the "H" prefix, following the method used by JR East (with an "E" prefix).

Exterior
The exterior design of the trains is broadly based on the experimental Fastech 360S train, with a colour scheme of  green for the upper body and  white for the lower body, separated by a "Hayate" pink stripe. For the H5 series, the "Hayate" pink stripe is replaced by a  purple stripe intended to evoke images of lilac, lupin, and lavender flowers for which Hokkaido is famous.

Interior
The trains have three classes of accommodation: premium Gran Class (car 10), Green class (car 9), and Ordinary class (cars 1 to 8).

Gran Class
Car 10 is designated "Gran Class", featuring 18 power-reclining "shell" seats with leather seat covers arranged in 2+1 abreast configuration. The pre-series set, S11, did not initially include Gran Class accommodation. The carpet in the H5 series's Gran Class car is blue with a pattern intended to evoke images of Hokkaido's sea and lakes. All seats in the H5 series feature AC power outlets.

Green car
Car 9 is designated as "Green car" (first class) accommodation with 55 seats arranged in 2+2 abreast configuration. The carpet in the H5 series's Green car is dark grey with a pattern depicting the ocean with fragments of drift ice. All seats in the H5 series feature AC power outlets.

Ordinary class
Seating is arranged in 3+2 abreast configuration. AC power outlets are provided for window seats and rows of seats at car ends for the E5 series, and all seats for the H5 series. The interior of the H5 series's ordinary-class cars is intended to evoke images of snow and the night view of Hakodate.

Gallery

E5

H5

Formation

E5 
The production E5 series sets are formed as follows, with car 1 at the Tokyo end and car 10 at the Aomori end.

Cars 3 and 7 each have one single-arm pantograph, although only one is normally raised in service.

H5 
The 10-car sets, numbered "H1" onward, are formed with eight motored ("M") cars and two non-powered trailer ("T") cars. Car 1 is at the southern end. Cars 3 and 7 each have one N-PS208 single-arm pantograph.

History

The pre-series set, S11, was delivered to Sendai Depot in May 2009 ahead of extensive test running on the Tohoku Shinkansen. Cars 1 to 5 were built by Hitachi in Yamaguchi Prefecture, and cars 6 to 10 were built by Kawasaki Heavy Industries in Hyogo Prefecture. Set S11 made its first appearance at Tokyo Station on 9 December 2009.

The first full-production set, U2, was delivered to Sendai Depot in December 2010.

In May 2012, the E5 series was awarded the 2012 Blue Ribbon Award, presented annually by the Japan Railfan Club. A formal presentation ceremony was held at Tokyo Station on 20 November 2012.

The pre-series set, S11, was upgraded to full-production standard in February 2013 and renumbered U1. It retains the flush plug doors for the passenger doors immediately behind the driving cabs, whereas the full-production sets have recessed sliding doors.

H5 series 
Details of the new H5 series trains on order were announced by JR Hokkaido in April 2014. The first set, H1, was shipped from Kawasaki Heavy Industries in Kobe to Hakodate Depot in October 2014. The second set was also delivered in October 2014.

In November 2014, JR Hokkaido officially announced details of the bodyside logos to be applied to the trains, combining an outline of Hokkaido with an image intended to portray the gyrfalcon native to Hokkaido.

Slow-speed test-running on the Hokkaido Shinkansen tracks within Hokkaido commenced from 1 December 2014, with the maximum speed of 260 km/h reached on 26 December. Test-running on the Tohoku Shinkansen south of Shin-Aomori commenced in November 2015.

Fleet list

E5 
, the fleet is as follows.

H5 
, the H5 series fleet is as follows. 

Set H2 was withdrawn in April 2022 following damage sustained from the 2022 Fukushima earthquake. The set was dismantled and remains at the port of Hakodate as of December 2022. It will be moved to a Shinkansen depot in Nanae, Hokkaido on a future date where it will then be used for staff training.

Accidents and incidents 
H5 series set H2, coupled with E6 series set Z9 and operating as Yamabiko No. 223 bound for Sendai, derailed during the 2022 Fukushima earthquake while traveling between Fukushima and Shiroishi-Zaō stations. There were no injuries on board.

Future developments
The E5 series trains have been chosen for use on the planned ₹1.08 trillion Mumbai–Ahmedabad high-speed rail corridor in India, scheduled to open in December 2027.

See also
 List of high speed trains

References

Further reading

External links

 JR East E5 series 
 JR East E5 series Hayabusa/Hayate/Yamabiko/Nasuno information 
 JR Hokkaido press release (16 April 2014) 

Shinkansen train series
East Japan Railway Company
Hokkaido Railway Company
25 kV AC multiple units
Train-related introductions in 2016
Train-related introductions in 2011
Hitachi multiple units
Tilting trains
Passenger trains running at least at 300 km/h in commercial operations
Kawasaki multiple units